The borders of Venezuela are the international borders that Venezuela shares with neighboring countries. Venezuela borders with 14 countries totaling 5,161 kilometers which includes territories of France (Martinique and Guadeloupe), the Kingdom of the Netherlands (Aruba, Curaçao and Bonaire), the United Kingdom (Montserrat) and the United States (Puerto Rico and the United States Virgin Islands). Venezuela has the seventh largest land and maritime border after France, China, the United Kingdom, Russia, the United States and Italy.

Bordering countries
The lengths of the borders Venezuela shares with different countries, running counter-clockwise around Grenada to Caribbean Netherlands, are listed below:

Total list
This is a list of countries and territories by land and maritime borders bordering Venezuela. The number and identity of other countries and territories that neighbor it are listed. Land borders and maritime boundaries are included and are tabulated separately and in combination. For purposes of this list, "maritime boundary" includes boundaries that are recognized by the United Nations Convention on the Law of the Sea, which includes boundaries of territorial waters, contiguous zones, and exclusive economic zones. However, it does not include lake or river boundaries, which are considered land boundaries.

Also included is the number of unique sovereign states that a country or territory shares as neighbors. If the number is higher due to multiple dependencies or unrecognized states bordering the state, the larger number is shown in brackets.

Footnotes are provided to provide clarity regarding the status of certain countries and territories.

Border disputes

With Guyana 
Guayana Esequiba

Gallery

See also 
 Borders of Brazil
 Borders of the United States
 Gran Colombia
 Venezuela–Colombia migrant crisis
 Netherlands–Venezuela Boundary Treaty
 The Guianas
 United States–Venezuela Maritime Boundary Treaty
 Venezuelan refugee crisis

References